William Hugh Robinson is an American engineer who is Professor of Electrical Engineering and Vice Provost for Academic at Vanderbilt University. His research considers sophisticated computer systems for consumer and industrial use. He is an advocate for improving access to engineering, and leads several investigations into programmes that better support people from marginalised groups.

Early life and education 
Robinson studied electrical engineering at the Florida A&M University. He was a graduate student at the Georgia Institute of Technology College of Computing, where he earned a master's degree and a doctorate. His doctoral research was in the portable image computation architecture group of D. Scott Wills. Robinson earned his PhD in 2003, where was made an Assistant Professor of Engineering.

Research and career 
Robinson leads the Security And Fault Tolerance (SAF-T) Research group at Vanderbilt University. In particular, his work focuses on the design and implementation of computing systems for industrial and medical applications. In these systems, Robinson makes use of information leakage to bridge the fields of computer networking and architecture. In 2010 Robinson was the first African-American to earn tenure in the department of engineering, and in 2018 became the first African-American to achieve tenure.  Robinson is a two-time winner of the Florida A&M University alumni awards, in both the Young and Outstanding categories.

Academic service 
Robinson has worked on several projects to improve diversity within science and engineering. He serves as chair of the 100 Black Men of Middle Tennessee, an organisation that looks to In 2016 he was awarded the Vanderbilt University Chancellor's Award for Research on Equity, Diversity and Inclusion. That year he was made Associate Dean. Robinson contributed to the book Diversifying STEM, which studied the intersection of race, gender and participation in science and engineering. Robinson leads the Vanderbilt University Explorations in Diversifying Engineering Faculty Initiative, a multi-disciplinary research programme that looks to better understand the factors that impact recruitment and retention of engineers who have been marginalised because of their race or gender. He was elected Chair of the Vanderbilt University Diversity Council in 2019. In this capacity, he leads the Academic Pathways programme which offers postdoctoral positions to researchers from marginalised groups. In June 2020 he was made Executive Director of the Vanderbilt University Provost's Office for Inclusive Excellence.

Selected publications

References 

Living people
Year of birth missing (living people)
African-American engineers
Computer scientists
American engineers
Florida A&M University alumni
Vanderbilt University faculty
Georgia Tech alumni